Max Kretzer (7 June 1854 – 15 July 1941) was a German writer. He left school at the age of thirteen and worked in a factory for twelve years. He became a prolific and successful novelist in the social realist style, depicting common working people.

Life

Max Kretzer was born on 7 June 1854 in Posen, then in Prussia.
His father was the main tenant of the Odeum, an establishment in which the provincial bourgeoisie held cultural events.
His father attempted to establish himself as an innkeeper, but failed.
With the family impoverished, at the age of 13 Max Kretzer had to leave school.
He moved to Berlin, where his father worked as a craftsman, and for twelve years worked in a factory.

Although poorly educated, Kretzer began a career as a self-taught writer after an accident at work in 1879.
He joined the Social Democrats the same year.
At first he published short sketches, then a long series of novels, which sold about one million copies in his lifetime. 
At that period this was a large number.
Despite this success, Kretzer was often poverty-stricken.
After 1933 Kretzer sympathized with Nazism. He died on 15 July 1941 in Berlin.

Work
Kretzer's work shows an ethical and increasingly Christian socialism, e.g. in "Das Gesicht Christi" (i.e. The Face of Christ), in which Jesus appears and fights "modern" degeneracy.
He was one of the first naturalist writers, and the first to describe crafts and industrial workers.
He was seen by his contemporaries as "the pioneer of the Berlin novel".
Works include:

 Die beiden Genossen (The Two Comrades), Berlin 1880
 Strange Enthusiast, Berlin, 2 volumes (1881)
 Die Betrogenen (The Deceived), Berlin, 2 volumes (1882)
 Schwarzkittel oder die Geheimnisse des Lichthofes (Black Coat or the Secrets of the Atrium), Leipzig [u. a.] 1882
 Berliner Novellen und Sittenbilder, Jena
 Vol. 1. Polizeiberichte, 1883
 Vol. 2. Die Zweiseelenmenschen, 1883
 Gesammelte Berliner Skizzen, Berlin [u. a.] 1883
 Die Verkommenen, Berlin, 2 volumes, 1883
 Im Sturmwind des Socialismus, Berlin 1884
 Drei Weiber, Jena, 2 volumes, 1886
 Im Riesennest, Leipzig 1886
 Im Sündenbabel, Leipzig 1886
 Bürgerlicher Tod, Dresden [u. a.] 1888
 Meister Timpe, Berlin 1888
 Ein verschlossener Mensch, Leipzig, 2 volumes. (1888)
 Das bunte Buch, Dresden [u. a.] 1889
 Die Bergpredigt, Dresden [u. a.], 2 volumes, 1890
 Onkel Fifi, Berlin 1890
 Gefärbtes Haar, Dresden [u. a.] 1891 
 Der Millionenbauer, Leipzig [Roman]; historischer Hintergrund siehe: Millionenbauern, 2 volumes, 1891
 Der Millionenbauer, Leipzig 1891 [Theaterstück]
 Irrlichter und Gespenster, Weimar, 3 volumes, 1892–93
 Der Baßgeiger. Das verhexte Buch, Leipzig 1894
 Die Buchhalterin, Dresden 1894
 Die gute Tochter, Dresden 1895
 Ein Unberühmter und andere Geschichten, Dresden [u. a.] 1895
 Der Blinde. Maler Ulrich, Dresden [u. a.] 1896
 Das Gesicht Christi, Leipzig [u. a.] 1896
 Frau von Mitleid und andere Novellen, Berlin 1896
 Furcht vor dem Heim und andere Novellen, Leipzig 1897
 Berliner Skizzen, Berlin 1898
 Der Sohn der Frau, Dresden [u. a.] 1899
 Verbundene Augen, Berlin, 2 volumes, 1899
 Großstadtmenschen, Berlin 1900
 Der Holzhändler, Berlin, 2 volumes, 1900
 Die Kunst zu heirathen, Berlin 1900
 Die Verderberin, Berlin 1900
 Warum?, Leipzig 1900
 Die Madonna vom Grunewald, Leipzig 1901
 Das Räthsel des Todes und andere Geschichten, Dresden 1901
 Der wandernde Thaler, Leipzig 1902
 Magd und Knecht, Berlin 1903
 Die Sphinx in Trauer, Berlin 1903
 Treibende Kräfte, Berlin-Charlottenburg 1903
 Familiensklaven, Berlin 1904
 Das Armband, Berlin 1905
 Der Mann ohne Gewissen, Berlin 1905
 Was ist Ruhm?, Berlin-Charlottenburg, 1905
 Herbststurm, Berlin-Charlottenburg 1906
 Das Kabarettferkel und andere neue Berliner Geschichten, Berlin 1907 
 Leo Lasso, Jauer [u. a.] 1907
 Söhne ihrer Väter, Jauer [u. a.] 1907
 Das Hinterzimmer, Jauer [u. a.] 1908
 Mut zur Sünde, Glogau [u. a.] 1909
 Reue, Leipzig 1910
 Waldemar Tempel, Leipzig 1911
 Die blanken Knöpfe, Leipzig 1912
 Lebensbilder, Leipzig 1912
 Das Mädchen aus der Fremde, Leipzig 1913
 Steh auf und wandle, Leipzig 1913 
 Gedichte, Dresden 1914
 Der irrende Richter, Dresden 1914
 Die alten Kämpen, Berlin 1916
 Berliner Geschichten, Berlin 1916
 Ignaz Serbynski, Berlin [u. a.] 1918
 Der Nachtmensch, Berlin [u. a.] 1918
 Kreuz und Geißel, Leipzig 1919
 Was das Leben spinnt, Berlin 1919
 Wilder Champagner, Leipzig 1919
 Assessor Lankens Verlobung, Berlin 1920
 Fidus Deutschling, Germanias Bastard, Dessau 1921
 Die Locke, Berlin 1922
 Der Rückfall des Doktor Horatius, Leipzig 1935
 Meister Timpe, Berlin: Das Neue Berlin, 1949

References

Sources

1854 births
1941 deaths

German male writers